Aftershocks is a play by Australian playwright Paul Brown. It was first performed at the Newcastle Playhouse, Newcastle in 1991.

Plot
A moving documentary play drawn from the traumatic recollections of members of the Newcastle Workers' Club, which was destroyed in the 1989 earthquake.

First Production
Aftershocks was first presented by the Workers’ Cultural Action Committee with the assistance of the Hunter Valley Theatre Company at the Newcastle Playhouse, Newcastle, on 12 November 1991 with the following cast and crew:

HOWARD, WAYNE: David Yarrow
BOB, STAN, EDDIE: Paul Makeham
JOHN, STEFO: David Cameron
LYN, MELBA, JULIE: Kath Leahy
ELAINE, MARG, PATRON: Rebecca Brandon
KERRY, FAY, JENNY: Sue Porter
Writer-in-residence, Paul Brown
Directors, Brent McGregor and David Watt
Designed by the Company
Lighting, Peter Ross
Project Administration, Julie Pavlou Kirri, and David Owens

References

Australian plays
1991 plays